Devonport may refer to:

 Devonport, Plymouth, Devon, England
 HMNB Devonport, naval base/dockyard
 Plymouth Devonport (UK Parliament constituency), parliamentary constituency formerly known as Devonport
 Devonport, New Zealand, a suburb of Auckland
 Devonport Naval Base, located in the same suburb
 Devonport, Tasmania, a city in Tasmania
 Devonport City Council, the local government area that contains the city

See also
Davenport (disambiguation)